Tashtyp (Khakas: Тастып, Tastıp) is a rural locality (a selo) and the administrative center of Tashtypsky District of the Republic of Khakassia, Russia. Population:

References

Notes

Sources

Rural localities in Khakassia